A dogcart (or dog-cart) is a light horse-drawn vehicle, originally designed for sporting shooters, with a box behind the driver's seat to contain one or more retriever dogs. The dog box could be converted to a second seat.  Later variants included :
 A one-horse carriage, usually two-wheeled and high, with two transverse seats set back to back. It was known as a "bounder" in British slang (not to be confused with the cabriolet of the same name). In India it was called a "tumtum" (possibly an altered form of "tandem").
 A French version having four wheels and seats set back to back was a dos-à-dos (French for "back-to-back").
 An American four-wheeled dogcart, having a compartment for killed game, was called a "game cart".

A young or small groom called a "tiger" might stand on a platform at the rear of a dogcart, to help or serve the driver.

Frequent references to dog-carts are made by Sir Arthur Conan Doyle in his writings about fictional detective Sherlock Holmes, and indeed by many other Victorian writers, as it was a common sight in those days.

Fashions in vehicles changed quickly in the nineteenth century, and there is a great variety of names for different types.  The dog-cart bears some resemblance to the phaeton, a sporty, lightly sprung one-horse carriage; the curricle, a smart, light vehicle that fits one driver and passenger, but with two horses; the chaise or shay, in its two-wheeled version for one or two people, with a chair back and a movable hood; and the cabriolet, with two wheels, a single horse, and a folding hood that can cover its two occupants, one of whom is the driver.

See also 
 Arrol-Johnston
 Governess cart
 Jaunting car
 Types of carriage

References 

Carriages
Carts